Circaea × ovata is a hybrid of flowering plants in the evening primrose family Onagraceae. The parents of the hybrid are Circaea cordata and Circaea mollis.

References

ovata
Plant nothospecies